The discography of Dutch rock band Golden Earring, which consists of 25 studio albums, 8 live albums, 2 compilation albums, and 74 singles.

Studio albums

Live albums

Compilation albums

Extended plays

Singles

References 

Rock music group discographies